This is a list of public holidays in Dominica.

References

Dominica
Dominica culture
Events in Dominica
Dominica